Southeast Aceh Regency is a regency in the Aceh special region of Indonesia. It is located on the island of Sumatra. In 1974, the Southeast Aceh Regency was created by being separated from the Central Aceh Regency; however in 2002 the northern part of this regency was itself split away to form the new Gayo Lues Regency. The regency now covers an area of 4,242.04 square kilometres and had a population of 179,010 at the 2010 census and 220,860 at the 2020 Census; the official estimate as at mid 2021 was 224,119. The seat of the regency government is at the town of Kutacane (which forms Babussalam district).
 
The main commodities produced in the regency are palm oil, cacao, coconut, coffee, nutmeg, walnut, and pachouli oil
 The main rivers are the Alas River and the Butan River. It contains the Leuser Ecosystem.

The Non-Alas People 
The original inhabitants of this regency are the Alas people. They use the Alas language and live under the customs (adat) of those people. However, the population of the Southeast Aceh Regency has become very diverse due to migration from other regencies of Aceh and beyond. Although this Regency is part of Aceh province, the Aceh people (an eastern coastal grouping) do not dominate this place.

Here are some other peoples other than Alas inhabiting the regency:
 The Gayo people, the majority of whom live in Bambel village.
 The Bataks (Karo, Mandailing, Toba, Nias) in Lawe Sigala-gala, Semadam, and Babussalam districts.
 The Javanese (Javanese and Sundanese people) in Badar district.
 Minangkabau people in Babussalam district (in the town of Kutacane).
 Singkil people in Bambel district.
 Acehnese people, mainly in Babussalam district (in the town of Kutacane).

There are other smaller ethnic groups that are still new to the Regency and do not constitute a majority population elsewhere, such as Palembangese Malay people.

Administrative borders

Administrative districts 
The regency is divided administratively into sixteen districts (kecamatan), listed below with their areas and their populations at the 2010 Census and the 2020 Census, together with the official estimates as at mid 2021.

Regents

See also 

 List of regencies and cities of Indonesia
 Kutacane
 Alas people

References 

Regencies of Aceh